

Overview
The NJI&I was originally created by the Singer Sewing Machine Company in order to transport their products from South Bend, Indiana, to a connection with the Wabash Railroad in Pine, Indiana. The line began service in 1905 and officially operated on only 11.4 miles of track. 

Up until and through World War I the line offered two passenger trains round trip daily to Detroit. In the 1930s passenger service was discontinued. The Wabash had purchased the line in 1926 but continued to operate it as a separate railroad. 

The major customers included Singer Manufacturing and The Studebaker Company. The NJI&I continued in service until 1982 when the Norfork Southern absorbed the line. Despite both manufacturers going out of business in the early 1960s and early 1970s, the line continued to operate for several other smaller customers.   

The name is derived from the three states Singer had plants in at the time of charter. The railroad was eventually taken over by the Wabash and operated through the Norfolk and Western takeover.  The line continued to service several customers until the NS-Conrail takeover allowed NS to access their customers via the former New York Central Chicago line. The line was abandoned and removed in the late 1990s.

Rolling stock
NJI&I was a steam railroad until the late 1940s. Locomotive #4 was an 0-4-0 built by Baldwin in January 1913. It later was used in a gravel pit outside St Louis, Missouri until around 1960.  In 2020 it was purchased by the American Industrial Railroad Society for restoration in its Davenport, Iowa facility.

The line was dieselized with an Alco S1 and a EMD NW2 (ex-Indiana Northern RR) switcher.  The latter currently is stored in Ohio. Operations now are handled by Norfolk Southern.

Buildings and structures
NJI&I is unique in having most of the main line torn up but many significant structures remaining. The headquarters at 1508 W. Western Avenue in South Bend still stands and is used as a daycare. The two stall roundhouse remains on Olive Street and is easily accessible for pictures, although trespassing is discouraged. The former Singer plant is no longer connected by rail but is still standing as a senior citizen's home on Western Avenue. This plant was the main reason for creation of NJI&I. As of 10-18-2018, the round house at 1625 South Olive Street has been torn down, as Norfolk Southern built a small yard next to the former site that is being used to house cars.

Current operations
NS operates locals to customers along the former NYC Kankakee Belt Line and NJI&I from the office along the Kankakee Belt beneath the overpass at Sample and Olive Streets in South Bend. Customers include Steel Warehouse (steel coils) and an Ethanol plant (corn) as well as a scrap yard. Were the former PRR Vandalia line to be active still (tracks remain) this local would service those customers too. The PRR Vandalia line is remaining from a connection with NJI&I down to Eckman Street, site of former Sibley Foundry. The spur to Sibley is no longer.

References

External links

 Tom Kepshire's NJI&I Page

Predecessors of the Wabash Railroad
Railway companies established in 1902
Railway companies disestablished in 1983
Defunct Indiana railroads